F430 may refer to:
 Cofactor F430, F430, the prosthetic group of the enzyme methyl coenzyme M reductase
 Farman F.430, a 1930s French light transport aircraft designed and built by Farman Aviation Works
 Ferrari F430, a supercar produced by Italian automaker Ferrari from 2004 to 2009